Freeman as a surname may refer to:

A–E
 Aaron Freeman (born 1956), American journalist, stand-up comedian, author, cartoonist, blogger
 Alan Freeman (1927–2006), Australian-born DJ
 Antonio Freeman (born 1972), American football player
 Ben Freeman, British actor
 Brian Freeman, several people
 Bobby Freeman (politician) (1934–2016), Louisiana attorney and politician
 Buck Freeman (1871–1949), American baseball outfielder
 Buck Freeman (pitcher) (1896–1953), American baseball pitcher
 Bucky Freeman (1895–1987), American football and baseball coach
 Bud Freeman (1906–1991), American jazz musician, bandleader, and composer
 Cassidy Freeman (born 1982), American actress
 Castle Freeman Jr. (born 1944), American author
 Cathy Freeman (born 1973), Australian Olympic athlete
 Charles Freeman (disambiguation)
 Chapman Freeman (1832–1904), US congressman from Pennsylvania 
 Christopher Freeman (1921–2010), English economist
 Crispin Freeman (born 1972), American voice actor 
 David Freeman (disambiguation)
 Daniel Freeman (1826–1908), American homesteader
 Dennis L. Freeman (born 1939), Iowa politician
 Denny Freeman (1944–2021), American Texas and electric blues guitarist
 Derek Freeman (1916–2001), New Zealander anthropologist
 Devonta Freeman (born 1992), American football player
 Don Freeman, children's book author
 Douglas Freeman (1916–2013), English cricketer
 Douglas Southall Freeman (1886–1953), American journalist
 Ed Freeman (1927–2008), U.S. Army helicopter pilot and Medal of Honor recipient
 Edward Augustus Freeman (1823–1892), British historian
 Edward Monroe Freeman (1875–1954), American botanist
 Elizabeth Freeman (disambiguation)
 Elizabeth Freeman (Mum Bett) (c.1742–1829), Massachusetts slave, won freedom 1781
 Emily Freeman, British athlete competing in the 200 meters
 Emma Freeman, Australian film director
 Ernest Arthur Freeman (1900–1975), English surgeon

F–M
 Frank Freeman (architect) (1861–1949), Canadian-American architect 
 Frankie Muse Freeman (1916–2018), American lawyer
 Freddie Freeman (born 1989), Canadian-American baseball first baseman
 Freeman Freeman-Thomas, 1st Marquess of Willingdon (1866–1941), Governor General of Canada and Viceroy of India 
 Gary Freeman (disambiguation)
 Gillian Freeman (1929–2019), British writer
 Greg Freeman (American football), American football player
 Habern W. Freeman (born 1941), Maryland politician
 Hannah Freeman (1731–1802), Lenape indigenous healer and artisan
 Hans Freeman (1929–2008), German-born Australian protein crystallographer and chemist
 Harold Freeman, maker of pornographic films who was involved in the court case California v. Freeman 
 Harry Lawrence Freeman (1869–1954), American composer, conductor, impresario and teacher
 Hobart Freeman (1920–1984), Word of Faith preacher and author
 James Freeman (disambiguation)
 Jay Freeman, developer of Cydia software
 Jerrell Freeman, American football player, linebacker for the Indianapolis Colts
 Joan Maie Freeman (1918–1998), Australian physicist
 John Freeman (disambiguation)
 Jon Freeman, influential computer game industry figure
 Jonathan Freeman (actor) (born 1950), Tony-nominated American actor known for voicing the villainous Jafar in Disney's Aladdin
 Jonathan Freeman (representative) (1745–1808), United States congressman from New Hampshire
 Jonathan Freeman-Attwood, principal of the Royal Academy of Music in London
 Joseph Freeman (Mormon) (born 1952), Latter Day Saints bishop
 Joseph Freeman (politician) (1765–1839), Nova Scotia politician
 Joseph Freeman (writer) (1897–1965), American left-wing writer and editor
 Josh Freeman, American football player, backup quarterback for the Minnesota Vikings
 Julia Wheelock Freeman (1833–1900), American Civil War nurse
 Julie Freeman (born 1972), British artist
 Julius "Julie" Freeman (1868–1921), American baseball pitcher
 Kathleen Freeman (classicist), (1897–1959), British classical scholar and novelist
 Ken Freeman (astronomer) (born 1940), Australian astronomer
 Kevin Freeman (basketball) (born 1978), American basketball player and coach
 Lennard Freeman (born 1995), American basketball player in the Israeli Basketball Premier League
 Lewis R. Freeman (1878–1960), American author
 Marcus Freeman (born 1986), American football coach and former player, current head coach of the Notre Dame Fighting Irish
 Mark Freeman (1908–2003), artist
 Martin Freeman (born 1971), English actor
 Martin Henry Freeman (1826–1889), first black president of an American college
 Mary Eleanor Wilkins Freeman, American author
 Mavis Freeman (1907–1992), Australian bacteriologist and biochemist
 Michael Freeman (chess player) (born 1960), New Zealand chess player
 Michael O. Freeman (born 1948), Minnesota attorney and politician
 Mona Freeman (1926–2014), American actress
 Morgan Freeman (born 1937), American actor
 Morgan J. Freeman (born 1969), American film director
 Mylène Freeman (born 1989), Canadian member of parliament

N–Z
 Nathaniel Freeman (physician) (1741–1827), American physician and jurist
 Nathaniel Freeman Jr. (1766–1800), American congressman
 Orville Freeman (1918–2003), Governor of Minnesota and US Secretary of Agriculture
 Paul Freeman (actor) (born 1943), British actor
 Paul Freeman (conductor) (1936–2015), American conductor
 Paul Freeman (cryptozoologist) (1943–2003), American Bigfoot hunter
 Paul Freeman (songwriter), Welsh-born singer-songwriter
 Paul L. Freeman Jr. (1907–1988), United States Army general
 Peter Freeman (musician) (1965–2021), American multi-instrumentalist and record producer
 Sir Ralph Freeman (1880–1950), English bridge designer (father of next entry)
 Sir Ralph Freeman (1911–1998), English bridge designer
 Richard Freeman (bridge) (1933–2009), American bridge player
 Richard Freeman (physician), sports physician and doctor
 R. Austin Freeman (1862–1943), British writer of detective stories
 Richard B. Freeman (born 1943), American labor economist
 Robert Freeman (pastor) (born 1878), American clergyman
 Robert Freeman (photographer) (1936–2019), English photographer
 Robert Tanner Freeman (1846–1873), American dentist
 Robin Freeman (basketball) (born 1934), two-time All-American guard at Ohio State University in the 1950s
 Robin Freeman (golfer) (born 1959), American professional golfer
 Roger Freeman (disambiguation)
 Royce Freeman (born 1996), American football player
 Russ Freeman (pianist) (1926–2002), American jazz pianist and composer
 Samuel Freeman (Canadian politician) (1824–1902), Canadian political figure
 Samuel Freeman (philosopher), American philosopher
 Samuel Freeman Miller (1816–1890), US Supreme Court justice
 Sarah Freeman (skier), Canadian skier
 Scott Freeman (1954–2004), American economist
 Scott Freeman (voice actor), American voice actor
 Séamus Freeman (1944-2022), Irish Roman Catholic prelate
 Sultaana Freeman, Muslim woman who sued for the right to wear a veil for her driver's license photo
 Tich Freeman (Alfred Percy Freeman, 1888–1965), Kent cricketer
 Tracey Freeman, Australian Paralympic athlete
 Tyler Freeman (baseball) (born 1999), American baseball player
 Walter Freeman (footballer) (1895–1972), English footballer
 Walter Jackson Freeman II (1895–1972), pioneer of psychosurgery
 Walter Jackson Freeman III (1927–2016), American biologist, theoretical neuroscientist and philosopher
 Wilfrid Freeman (1888–1953), British air marshal
 Woody Freeman (born 1946), Arkansas businessman and 1984 Republican gubernatorial nominee
 Y. Frank Freeman (1890–1969), American film company executive

Fictional characters
 Amber Freeman, a character from the 2022 film Scream
 Augustus Freeman IV, secret identity of DC comics superhero Icon
 Billy Freeman, a character from the novel Doctor Sleep
 Crying Freeman, the main character in the anime, manga and live-action movie of the same name
 Django Freeman, protagonist of the film Django Unchained
 Elijah Freeman, protagonist of the novel Elijah of Buxton
 Francis Freeman, a character from the 2016 film Deadpool
 Gordon Freeman, "The One Free Man", the silent protagonist from the computer-game series Half-Life
 Atticus Freeman, the protagonist from the 2020 show Lovecraft Country
 Huey Freeman, one of the protagonists from the comic strip and TV Series The Boondocks
 Lester Freamon, (similarly spelled and pronounced) a police detective on the HBO drama The Wire
 Matt Freeman (Power of Five), a character from Anthony Horowitz's Power of Five series
 Mr. Freeman, the main character of an animated web series
 Riley Freeman, one of the protagonists from the comic strip and TV Series The Boondocks
 Robert Jebediah Freeman, one of the protagonists from the comic strip and TV Series The Boondocks
 Vincent Anton Freeman, protagonist of the film Gattaca

See also
 Freeman (disambiguation)
 Friman (surname)

English-language surnames